CMS may refer to:

Computing
 Call management system
 CMS-2 (programming language), used by the United States Navy
 Code Morphing Software, a technology used by Transmeta
 Collection management system for a museum collection
 Color management system, a system for computers to control the representation of colors
 Concurrent mark sweep collector, a garbage collector in the Oracle HotSpot Java virtual machine 
 Configuration management system
 Construction and management simulation, a type of simulation video game
 Contact management system, an integrated office solution to record relationships and interactions with customers and suppliers
 Content management system, a system for managing content and providing it in various formats
 Conversational Monitor System, previously Cambridge Monitor System, an IBM mainframe operating system, also known as VM/CMS and CP/CMS 
 Course management system, software that facilitates e-learning or computer learning
 Credential management system, also known as Smart card management system(SCMS) and Card management system(CMS)
 Cryptographic Message Syntax, a cryptographic standard

Medicine
 Chronic mountain sickness, or Monge's disease, a disease caused by high altitude
 Congenital mitral stenosis
 Congenital myasthenic syndrome, an inherited neuromuscular disorder

Organizations

Education

United States
 Calexico Mission School, a private school in Calexico, California, USA
 Cardigan Mountain School, a junior boarding school in Canaan, New Hampshire, USA
Carpentersville Middle School, a public school in Carpentersville, Illinois, USA
 Caruso Middle School, a public school in Deerfield, Illinois, USA
 Cedar Middle School, a public school in Cedar City, Utah, USA
 Centennial Middle School, a public school in Snohomish, Washington, USA
 Charlotte-Mecklenburg Schools, local school district in North Carolina, USA
 Chicago Medical School, in North Chicago, Illinois
 Chickahominy Middle School, a public school in Mechanicsville, Virginia, USA
 Claremont-Mudd-Scripps Stags and Athenas, the joint athletic team of Claremont McKenna College, Harvey Mudd College, and Scripps College in Claremont, California, USA
 Clarksville Middle School, a public school in Clarksville, Maryland, USA
 Colina Middle School, in Thousand Oaks, California, USA
 Colonia Middle School In Colonia, New Jersey, USA
 Community Middle School, a public school in Plainsboro, New Jersey, USA
 Creekwood Middle School, a public school in Kingwood, Houston, Texas, USA
 Crestview Middle School, a middle school in Clarkson Valley, St. Louis County, Missouri, USA
 Crest Memorial School (of the Wildwood Crest School District), a public K-8 school in Wildwood Crest, New Jersey, USA

India
 Church Mission Society High School, CMS High School, Thrissur, Kerala, India
 City Montessori School, in Lucknow, India
 CMS College Kottayam, in Kottayam, Kerala, India

Other
 Church Mission School, Pakistan
 C.M.S. Ladies' College, Colombo, Sri Lanka

Mathematics
 Calcutta Mathematical Society or CalMathSoc, a professional society for mathematicians at Kolkata, India
 Canadian Mathematical Society, a professional society for mathematicians
 Centre for Mathematical Sciences (disambiguation), several organisations
 Centre for Mathematical Sciences (Cambridge), the mathematics centre at Cambridge University
 Centre for Mathematical Sciences (Kerala), India
 Council for the Mathematical Sciences, a forum for mathematical societies in the UK
 Cyprus Mathematical Society, a non-profit society in Cyprus
 Chinese Mathematical Society, a professional society for mathematicians in China.

Other
 Centers for Medicare and Medicaid Services, a federal agency in the United States, part of the Department of Health and Human Services
 China Marine Surveillance, the maritime surveillance agency of the People's Republic of China
 Church Mission Society, an evangelistic religious organization
 CMS Cameron McKenna Nabarro Olswang, an international law firm based in London
 CMS Energy, a public utility in Michigan
 Colorado Medical Society, a non-profit organization of physicians in Colorado
 Court of Master Sommeliers, an organisation educating and certifying sommeliers
 Illinois Department of Central Management Services, a state agency

Science
 China Manned Space Program, China's human spaceflight program started in 1992
 Compact mass spectrometer
 Compact Muon Solenoid, a particle physics detector at CERN
 Cytoplasmic male sterility, in seed breeding

Other
 Cable management system, the managing of electrical or optical cable 
 Cavity monitoring system, a system for surveying stopes in an underground mine where it is not safe or possible to send a person
 Changeable-message sign, a variable road sign
 Charlotte Motor Speedway, a speedway in Concord, North Carolina, north of Charlotte
 The Chicago Manual of Style, a style guide for American English
 Chief master sergeant, a rank in the US Air Force
 Central Monitoring System, an Indian clandestine mass electronic surveillance program
 Certified Master Safecracker, an American trade qualification
 Cms (angel), a minor angel in Enochian occult tradition
 Collateral management system, in banking
 Community Management Statement, a document for defining the lot entitlements in a Community Title Scheme, a form of Strata title in Queensland, Australia.
 Conservation management system, a procedure for maintaining a species or habitat
 Constant maturity swap, in finance and investing
 Convention on Migratory Species, or the Bonn Convention, an intergovernmental wildlife conservation treaty
 Critical management studies, a left-wing approach to management, business and organization
 CMS Enhancements, a semi-defunct American computer systems and data storage company